The Archdeacon of Northolt is a senior ecclesiastical officer within the Diocese of London. As such he or she is responsible for the disciplinary supervision of the clergy within its four area deaneries: Brent, Hillingdon, Ealing and Harrow.

The post was inaugurated in 1970 and is currently held by Catherine Pickford.

List of archdeacons
1970–1980 (ret.): Roy Southwell (first archdeacon; afterward archdeacon emeritus)
1980–1985 (res.): Tom Butler
1985–1992 (res.): Eddie Shirras
1992–1994 (res.): Michael Colclough
1995–2001 (res.): Pete Broadbent
2001–2005 (res.): Christopher Chessun
2006–2011 (res.): Rachel Treweek
20111 April 2013: post vacant – acting archdeacon: the area Bishop of Willesden (Pete Broadbent)
 1 April 201330 November 2019 (ret.): Duncan Green
 September 2020 onwards: Catherine Pickford

References

 
Lists of Anglicans
Lists of English people